Nathan Lozada (born 21 June 1999), is an Australian professional footballer who plays as a forward for Weston Bears.

References

External links

1999 births
Living people
Australian soccer players
Association football forwards
Uruguayan Segunda División players
National Premier Leagues players
Central Coast Mariners FC players